Cherry-Ann Singh (born 13 February 1961) is a Trinidadian former cricketer who played as a slow left-arm orthodox bowler. She appeared in seven One Day Internationals for the West Indies, all at the 1993 World Cup. She played domestic cricket for Trinidad and Tobago.

Singh played in all seven of the West Indies' matches at the World Cup, one of only four members of her team to do so. Against India in the first match of the tournament, which was her One Day International (ODI) debut, she took 1/14 from five overs, and also scored 17 runs coming in seventh in the batting order. Singh finished the tournament with 13 wickets, by far the most for her team – Carol-Ann James was the next-best, with eight wickets. In her final four matches, she took 2/11 against Denmark, 2/20 against New Zealand, 2/20 against England, and 5/36 against Ireland. Her performance against Ireland was the first ODI five-wicket haul by a West Indian woman, and stood as a team record until August 2011, when it was broken by Anisa Mohammed.

References

External links
 
 

1961 births
Living people
West Indian women cricketers
West Indies women One Day International cricketers
Trinidad and Tobago women cricketers
Trinidad and Tobago people of Indian descent